Chase Buchanan and Tennys Sandgren were the defending champions but only Sandgren chose to defend his title, partnering Austin Krajicek. Sandgren lost in the quarterfinals to Brian Baker and Sam Groth.

Baker and Groth won the title after defeating Brydan Klein and Ruan Roelofse 6–3, 6–3 in the final.

Seeds

Draw

References
 Main Draw
 Qualifying Draw

Charlottesville Men's Pro Challenger - Doubles